Conus lamberti is a species of sea snail, a marine gastropod mollusk in the family Conidae, the cone snails and their allies.

Like all species within the genus Conus, these snails are predatory and venomous. They are capable of "stinging" humans, therefore live ones should be handled carefully or not at all.

Description
The size of the shell varies between 70 mm and 114 mm. The smooth shell is orange-brown, with large subtriangular white patches, mostly arranged so as to indicate three broad bands.

Distribution
This marine species occurs off New Caledonia

References

 Souverbie, [S.-M.] 1877. Descriptions d'espèces nouvelles de l'Archipel Calédonien. Journal de Conchyliologie 25:71–76, 2 pls. page(s): 71, pl. 1 fig. 1, pl. 2 fig. 7
 Puillandre N., Duda T.F., Meyer C., Olivera B.M. & Bouchet P. (2015). One, four or 100 genera? A new classification of the cone snails. Journal of Molluscan Studies. 81: 1–23

External links
 The Conus Biodiversity website
 

lamberti
Gastropods described in 1877